The 2019 UEFA Regions' Cup was the 11th edition of the UEFA Regions' Cup, a football competition for amateur teams in Europe organized by UEFA.

In the final, Lower Silesia from Poland defeated hosts Bavaria to become the second two-time Regions' Cup winners (joining Veneto from Italy), after winning their first title in 2007. Zagreb from Croatia were the title holders, but were eliminated in the intermediate round.

Teams
A total of 39 teams entered the tournament. Each of the 55 UEFA member associations could enter a regional amateur representative team which qualified through a national qualifying competition, or when applicable, their national amateur representative team.

Associations were ranked according to their UEFA coefficients, computed based on results of the last three seasons (2013, 2015, 2017), to decide on the round their teams entered and their seeding pots in the preliminary and intermediate round draws. The top 27 associations entered the intermediate round, while the bottom 12 associations (ranked 28–39) entered the preliminary round.

The draws for the preliminary and intermediate rounds was held on 6 December 2017, 13:30 CET (UTC+1), at the UEFA headquarters in Nyon, Switzerland. The mechanism of the draws for each round was as follows:
In the preliminary round, the twelve teams were drawn into three groups of four without any seeding.
In the intermediate round, the 32 teams were drawn into eight groups of four. Each group contained one team from Pot A, one team from Pot B, one team from Pot C, and either one team from Pot D or one of the five teams which advanced from the preliminary round (whose identity was not known at the time of the draw):
Preliminary round Group A winner would be assigned to Group 1.
Preliminary round Group B winner would be assigned to Group 2.
Preliminary round Group C winner would be assigned to Group 3.
Preliminary round best runner-up would be assigned to Group 4.
Preliminary round second best runner-up would be assigned to Group 5.
The three teams from Pot D would be drawn to Groups 6–8.

For political reasons, teams from Russia and Ukraine would not be drawn in the same group. The hosts for each group in the preliminary and intermediate rounds would be selected after the draw.

Format
In the preliminary round and intermediate round, each group is played as a round-robin mini-tournament at one of the teams selected as hosts after the draw.

In the final tournament, the eight qualified teams play a group stage (two groups of four) followed by the final between the group winners, at a host selected by UEFA from one of the teams.

In the preliminary round, intermediate round and final tournament, the schedule of each group is as follows, with two rest days between each matchday, except for between matchdays 1 and 2 in the final tournament where there is only one rest day (Regulations Articles 19.04 and 19.07):

Tiebreakers
In the preliminary round, intermediate round, and group stage of the final tournament, teams are ranked according to points (3 points for a win, 1 point for a draw, 0 points for a loss), and if tied on points, the following tiebreaking criteria are applied, in the order given, to determine the rankings (Regulations Articles 14.01, 14.02, 16.01 and 16.02):
Points in head-to-head matches among tied teams;
Goal difference in head-to-head matches among tied teams;
Goals scored in head-to-head matches among tied teams;
If more than two teams are tied, and after applying all head-to-head criteria above, a subset of teams are still tied, all head-to-head criteria above are reapplied exclusively to this subset of teams;
Goal difference in all group matches;
Goals scored in all group matches;
Penalty shoot-out if only two teams have the same number of points, and they met in the last round of the group and are tied after applying all criteria above (not used if more than two teams have the same number of points, or if their rankings are not relevant for qualification for the next stage);
Disciplinary points (red card = 3 points, yellow card = 1 point, expulsion for two yellow cards in one match = 3 points);
UEFA coefficient;
Drawing of lots.

Preliminary round
The three group winners and the two best runners-up advance to the intermediate round to join the 27 teams which receive byes to the intermediate round. The preliminary round must be played by 31 July 2018.

Times are CEST (UTC+2), as listed by UEFA (local times, if different, are in parentheses).

Group A

Group B

Group C

Ranking of second-placed teams

Intermediate round
The eight group winners advance to the final tournament. The intermediate round must be played by 16 December 2018.

Times are CEST (UTC+2), as listed by UEFA (local times, if different, are in parentheses).

Group 1

Group 2
Note: Slovakia were originally to host.

Group 3

Group 4

Group 5

Group 6

Group 7

Group 8

Final tournament
The hosts of the final tournament were selected by UEFA from the eight qualified teams. Bavaria were announced as hosts on 18 December 2018, with the final tournament taking place between 18–26 June 2019.

Qualified teams
The following teams qualified for the final tournament.

Final draw
The draw for the final tournament was held on 13 March 2019, at half-time of the UEFA Champions League round of 16 second leg between Bayern Munich and Liverpool (kick-off 21:00 local time), at the Allianz Arena in Munich. The eight teams were drawn into two groups of four without any seeding, except that the hosts Bavaria were assigned to position A1 in the draw.

Venues
The tournament was held in five venues in Bavaria:
Wacker-Arena, Burghausen
Stadion Hankofen, Leiblfing
Städtisches Stadion, Kelheim
Hammerbachstadion, Landshut
Anton-Treffer-Stadion, Neustadt an der Donau

Group stage
The schedule of the final tournament was announced on 28 March 2019.

The two group winners advance to the final, while the two group runners-up receive bronze medals.

Times are CEST (UTC+2), as listed by UEFA.

Group A

Group B

Final
In the final, extra time and penalty shoot-out are used to decide the winner if necessary.

Top goalscorers
Preliminary round: 
Intermediate round: 
Final tournament:

References

External links

2019
Regions
June 2018 sports events in Germany
July 2018 sports events in Germany
September 2018 sports events in Germany
October 2018 sports events in Germany
June 2019 sports events in Germany